Rickey Keeton (born March 18, 1957) is an American former professional right-handed pitcher. Keeton attended Western Hills High School in Cincinnati, Ohio, and Southern Illinois University in Carbondale, Ill.

Sources
, or Retrosheet
Pura Pelota
 

1957 births
Living people
American expatriate baseball players in Canada
Baseball players from Cincinnati
Holyoke Millers players
Major League Baseball pitchers
Milwaukee Brewers players
Omaha Royals players
Southern Illinois Salukis baseball players
Tigres de Aragua players
American expatriate baseball players in Venezuela
Tucson Toros players
Vancouver Canadians players
Peninsula Oilers players